Dignity Health Sports Park is a multi-use sports complex located on the campus of California State University, Dominguez Hills in Carson, California. The complex consists of the 27,000-seat Dignity Health Sports Park soccer stadium, the Dignity Health Sports Park tennis stadium, a track-and-field facility, and the VELO Sports Center velodrome. The main stadium is also home to the Los Angeles Wildcats of the XFL. The LA Galaxy II of the USL Championship play their home matches at the complex's track and field facility. For 2020 and 2021, the stadium served as the temporary home of the San Diego State Aztecs football team.

Opened in 2003, the $150 million complex was developed and is operated by the Anschutz Entertainment Group. With a seating capacity of 27,000, it is the second largest soccer-specific stadium in the United States, after Geodis Park in Nashville, Tennessee, and the third-largest among its kind in MLS, after Geodis Park and BMO Field in Toronto. During its first decade, the stadium was known as Home Depot Center through a naming rights deal with hardware retailer The Home Depot. In 2013, the name was changed to StubHub Center after naming rights were sold to online ticket marketplace StubHub. The current name, from healthcare provider Dignity Health, debuted in 2019. 

In addition to hosting LA Galaxy games since its opening, the stadium also served as the home of the now-defunct Chivas USA MLS team from 2005 to 2014. The stadium was the temporary home of the Los Angeles Chargers of the National Football League (NFL) from 2017 to 2019, being the smallest NFL stadium over the course of those three seasons. When the Chargers played at the stadium, the facility was known as ROKiT Field at StubHub Center as part of a "multi-year" agreement with ROKiT.

History and facilities 
Originally opened as Home Depot Center in 2003, it was renamed StubHub Center on June 1, 2013. It was renamed Dignity Health Sports Park on January 1, 2019, after Dignity Health signed a new naming rights agreement.

The 27,000-seat main stadium was the second American sports arena designed specifically for soccer in the MLS era. When the venue opened in June 2003 as the new home of LA Galaxy, a number of special events took place in celebration. Pelé was in attendance at the opening match along with many dignitaries from the soccer world and other celebrities.

In addition to the soccer stadium, Dignity Health Sports Park features the 2,450-seat VELO Sports Center (velodrome), an 8,000-seat tennis stadium, and an outdoor track and field facility that has 2,000 permanent seats and is expandable to 20,000.
Soccer stadium building costs within the $150 million complex were around $87 million.

2017 renovations 
In 2017, to accommodate the Chargers' use of the stadium, upgrades were made at cost to the Chargers including bleachers in the second deck on the east side of the stadium being replaced by tip-up seats and moved to the berm on the north side, adding 1,000 seats. A new section of upper-level bleachers, which seat 330, were erected in the southeast corner of the stadium. Also, the luxury suites were renovated with new seats, furniture, community tables, and engineered hardwood floors and the press box underwent an upgrade with a third row added to the main box, boosting capacity from about 35 to 53. Floors were constructed on the roof of the luxury suites so an auxiliary press box could be built on both sides of the main box.

Two new radio booths were built outside the south side of the press box, and a large new booth on the north side to serve as a security command post for police and NFL officials was constructed. Two booths were added on each side of the press box for the NFL-mandated 20-yard-line television cameras, and a stairway allowing access to the roof of the main box was built to accommodate the 50-yard-line camera. To accommodate 53-man NFL rosters, four small locker rooms were converted to two larger ones with 60 cubicles in each. Also added were small postgame news conference rooms for each team and rooms for game officials and the chain gang. After the Chargers left for Inglewood, the football facilities were taken over by the Wildcats when the XFL team began operations in 2020.

Soccer 

Aside from being home to the LA Galaxy of Major League Soccer, it was also home to two defunct clubs, the MLS team Chivas USA as well as Los Angeles Sol of the Women's Professional Soccer. The stadium hosted the 2003 MLS All-Star Game and the MLS Cup in 2003, 2004, 2008, 2011, 2012  and 2014.

Dignity Health Sports Park was also the site of the 2003 FIFA Women's World Cup final. Both the United States women's and men's national football teams often use the facility for training camps and select home matches.

It also hosted the 2004 NCAA Men's College Cup, with Duke, Indiana, Maryland, and UC Santa Barbara qualifying.

The track and field stadium on the site is also home to the LA Galaxy II of the USL Championship, farm club to the parent Galaxy.

On July 30, 2016, it hosted a 2016 International Champions Cup match between Paris Saint-Germain and Leicester City. Paris Saint-Germain won the match 4–0 to complete a perfect record in the ICC.

International women's football matches

MLS Cup

Other international matches

Rugby
The stadium hosted the first three editions (2004–06) of the USA Sevens, an annual international rugby sevens competition that is part of the World Rugby Sevens Series, again hosted that event on February 29 to March 1, 2020. and is announced to host the 2022 edition on March 6–7, 2022.

The stadium has also hosted all United States national team matches for the Pacific Nations Cup between 2013 and 2014. and the "Quest For Gold" pre-Olympic Rugby Sevens showcase on June 25–26, 2021. 

The stadium is scheduled to host the 2028 Olympic Rugby Sevens tournaments.

USA Eagles Internationals
USA scores displayed first.

Champion of Champions Liga MX competition

Other sports 

It was also the location for the State Championship Bowl Games for high school football teams in the state of California from 2006 to 2014. The Semper Fidelis All America game was held there on January 5, 2014, featuring an East vs West high school matchup. The first college football game was held at the stadium on January 21, 2012, as the AstroTurf NFLPA Collegiate Bowl, with the National Team beating the American Team 20–14.

The track played host to the 2005 USA Outdoor Track and Field Championships. It is also the home of the Adidas Running Club, a member of the USA Elite Running Circuit, and the Adidas Track Classic. Dignity Health Sports Park is also home to  EXOS, formerly Athletes' Performance, which trains athletes in a variety of sports.

The Los Angeles Riptide of Major League Lacrosse played their home games at the track and field stadium.

The soccer and tennis stadiums of the Center have also served as the main venues for ESPN's Summer X Games.

From 2010 to 2016, it hosted the Reebok CrossFit Games. Initially only utilizing the tennis stadium, over the years it also expanded to the running field and the soccer stadium.

The facility has also hosted several high-profile professional boxing matches, including Andre Ward vs. Arthur Abraham, Brandon Ríos vs. Urbano Antillón, Shawn Porter vs. Kell Brook and matches featuring other notable fighters. The venue has become iconic among boxing fans for its electric atmosphere.

On August 16, 2013, Resurrection Fighting Alliance held an MMA event titled RFA 9: Curran vs. Munhoz, with the main event crowning a new Bantamweight Champion.

Los Angeles Chargers 
The Los Angeles Chargers had a three-year tenure at Dignity Health Sports Park from 2017 to 2019, while SoFi Stadium in Inglewood was being built. During the team's three seasons at the stadium, they compiled an even 11–11 record. Chargers fans were outnumbered by opposing teams' supporters, who frequently filled much of the stadium.

San Diego State Aztecs 
The stadium served as the temporary home of the San Diego State Aztecs football team from San Diego State University. The 2020 and 2021 seasons were played at Dignity Health Sports Park until Aztec Stadium in San Diego, the replacement for the Aztecs' former home of San Diego Stadium, is completed for the 2022 season. The final Aztecs game held at the stadium was the 2021 Mountain West Conference Football Championship Game, a 46-13 loss by the Aztecs to the Utah State Aggies. During the team's two seasons at the stadium, they compiled a 9-3 record (3-1 in 2020 and 6-2 in 2021).

2028 Summer Olympics 
During the 2028 Summer Olympics, the venue will host rugby, tennis, modern pentathlon, field hockey, and track cycling.

Entertainment

Concerts
The Vans Warped Tour was held annually in the stadium parking lot until the tour's final year in 2018.

It also served as the host facility for the first two seasons of Spike TV's Pros vs Joes reality sports contests.

In 2007 it received the bands Héroes del Silencio, in their Tour 2007, and Soda Stereo in their Me Verás Volver tour 2007.

In film and TV
The facility is frequently used to provide a stadium background in film, television and advertising. The complex was the site of tasks for the third season of the CBS reality competition Tough as Nails. The sports park was the site of the final task and finish line of 33rd season of The Amazing Race.

Transportation
Dignity Health Sports Park is located south of the Avalon Boulevard exit on California State Route 91.

In 2017, the LA Galaxy launched a shuttle bus service operated by Long Beach Transit.  With two routes connecting Dignity Health Sports Park with the Harbor Gateway Transit Center and Del Amo station of LA Metro Rail.

References

External links 

 Dignity Health Sports Park official website

American football venues in California
Athletics (track and field) venues in California
Anschutz Corporation
Boxing venues in California
Buildings and structures in Carson, California
Chivas USA
Defunct college football venues
CONCACAF Gold Cup stadiums
Defunct National Football League venues
2003 FIFA Women's World Cup stadiums
Lacrosse venues in California
Former Major League Lacrosse venues
LA Galaxy
Los Angeles Chargers stadiums
Los Angeles Sol
Los Angeles Wildcats
Major League Soccer stadiums
Rugby union stadiums in California
San Diego State Aztecs football venues
Sports venues in Carson, California
Sports venues completed in 2003
USL Championship stadiums
Women's Professional Soccer stadiums
Venues of the 2028 Summer Olympics
Olympic rugby venues
Olympic field hockey venues
Olympic modern pentathlon venues
Olympic tennis venues
2003 establishments in California
California State University, Dominguez Hills
Sports complexes in the United States
XFL (2020) venues
World Rugby Sevens Series venues